Aerides leeana is a species of plant in the family Orchidaceae. It is endemic to the Philippines. Its natural habitat is subtropical or tropical moist lowland forests. It is threatened by habitat loss.

Growing in brightly lit environments at low altitude, found in the provinces of Bataan, Camarines Norte, Camarines Sur, Cavite, Quezon and Rizal on the island of Luzon in the Philippines, Aerides leeana is erect 35 cm tall, and monopodial, it sometimes becomes pendulous.

References

External links 

leeana
Plants described in 1881
Endemic orchids of the Philippines
Flora of Luzon
Flora of the Visayas
Vulnerable flora of Asia